Lidhult is a locality situated in Ljungby Municipality, Kronoberg County, Sweden with 611 inhabitants in 2010.

References 

Populated places in Kronoberg County
Populated places in Ljungby Municipality
Finnveden